Kentucky Route 1142 (KY 1142), also known as Palatka Road, is a  state highway in the U.S. State of Kentucky. Its western terminus is at KY 1931 in Louisville and its eastern terminus is at KY 907 in Louisville.

Major junctions

References

1142
1142
Transportation in Louisville, Kentucky